The Military Order of Savoy was a military honorary order of the Kingdom of Sardinia first, and of the Kingdom of Italy later. Following the abolition of the Italian monarchy, the order became the Military Order of Italy.

History 

The origin of the Military Order of Savoy can be traced back to the first honorary degrees granted by Victor Amadeus III of Sardinia to its soldiers (see Gold Medal of Military Valor).

Later this degrees went into disuse because of the Napoleonic regime in Italy and especially in Piedmont. On 1 April 1815 these honorary degrees were used again by Victor Emmanuel I of Sardinia and later abolished on the 14th of August of the same year.

Later again, all of these honorary degrees become part of one, and became, the Military Order of Savoy. This military order was to be granted to the soldiers who fought in the Italian army of Napoleon and became part of the Legion of Honor (or either obtained the honorary degree of Order of the Iron Crown) due to military merit. This honorary degree was conceded to everyone no matter what religion or rank the soldier was.

This degree was a typically French honorary degree.

Another purpose this Order was created to reward all other kind of military merit, to the simple soldier and up to the high-ranked officer, that performed a special military feat during battle.

Following the foundation of the Republic, the order was renamed the Military Order of Italy in 1947; it continues to be awarded under that title today.

Ranking 

The Order was once split into four different grades of merit:

Knight Grand Cross
Commander
Knight
Militant (soldier)

With the entry of this new Order in the honorary degree system of the Kingdom of Italy these four different grades were then modified into five:

Knight Grand Cross
Grand Officer
Commander
Officer
Militant or Knight

For the latter degree, use of the term Knight (cavaliere) was more frequent than that of Militant (milite), although that term was never officially abolished.

Insignia 

The medal was a silver Savoy cross, for the militants, and golden for all the other rankings.
The cross was covered with white and red enamel and was surrounded with a laurel crown covered with green enamel.
On top of the medal there was the royal crown of Sardinia, the medal was personally given from the sovereign in presence of the ranked troops in order to give military honours.

The militants wore the medal hanging from a blue ribbon pinned on the uniform at the height of the chest.
The cavaliers wore it in the same manner but on top of the medal there was a rosette. The commendatore wore the medal hanging from a blue ribbon around the neck while the Knight Grand Cross wore it hanging from a blue shoulder-strap at the height of the left hip together with a rosette pinned to the chest made out of silver and a round blue shield engraved on it and topped with the VE letters and circled with the engraving To the Merit and Valour.

See also 
 Military Order of Italy
 Gold Medal of Military Valor

External links 
 Presidenza della Repubblica – Le Onorificenze 
 Ordini dinastici della Real Casa di Savoia 

 
Military awards and decorations of Italy
Awards established in 1815